Orvar Jönsson (born 5 September 1950) is a Swedish fencer. He competed in the individual and team épée events at the 1972 Summer Olympics.

References

External links
 

1950 births
Living people
Swedish male épée fencers
Olympic fencers of Sweden
Fencers at the 1972 Summer Olympics
Sportspeople from Malmö
20th-century Swedish people